Qohab-e Sarsar Rural District is a rural district (dehestan) in Amirabad District, Damghan County, Semnan Province, Iran. At the 2006 census, its population was 1,559, in 531 families.  The rural district has 18 villages.

References 

Rural Districts of Semnan Province
Damghan County